Jan Jesenský (1870 Prague – 1947 Prague), professor (1911) of stomatology at Prague University.

He was the founder and head of the Prague Stomatology Clinic until the German occupation in 1939, a member of the Bohemian Academy, a member of International Association for Dental Research (IADR), whose Honorary Vice-President he became 1933–1935), and co-founder of its Prague Section in 1932.

See also
House of Jeszenszky

References
 František Neuwirt: Jan Jesenský, nakladatelství České akademie věd a umění, Prague 1948

1870 births
1947 deaths
Academic staff of Charles University
Recipients of the Order of Tomáš Garrigue Masaryk